Encyclopedia of Science Fiction or Science Fiction Encyclopedia may refer to:

 The Encyclopedia of Science Fiction and Fantasy (first volume published in 1974), edited by Donald H. Tuck
 The Visual Encyclopedia of Science Fiction (published 1977), edited by Brian Ash
 The Encyclopedia of Science Fiction (first edition published 1979; now online), edited by Peter Nicholls and John Clute
 Encyclopedia of Science Fiction (1978 book), with consultant editor Robert Holdstock
 The Greenwood Encyclopedia of Science Fiction and Fantasy (2005), edited by Gary Westfahl
 Encyclopedia of Science Fiction (2005 book), by Don D'Ammassa
 Science Fact and Science Fiction: An Encyclopedia (2006), by Brian Stableford